The black-fronted duiker (Cephalophus nigrifrons) is a small antelope found in central and west-central Africa.

Description
The black-fronted duiker is a compact, short-necked, and active antelope that gets its name from the broad black streak that runs from the nose to its forehead, a feature distinguishing it from its congeners. It has a glossy coat that is deep reddish-mahogany to a lighter orange-chestnut in colour, the hair becoming sparser and darker on the long legs. It has a short tail that is black with a white tip and short, pointed horns, measuring 4–12 cm, which are carried by both sexes and are used for defense against other duikers and predators. Their elongated hooves appear to be an adaptation to the wet habitats they seem to prefer.

Distribution
The black-fronted duiker is found in central and west-central Africa, with an isolated population in the Niger Delta in eastern Nigeria and then from southern Cameroon east to western Kenya and south to northern Angola.

Habitat
The black-fronted duiker occurs in montane, lowland, and swamp forests, from near sea level up to an altitude of 3,500 metres. It is frequently recorded in wetter areas such as marshes or on the margins of rivers or streams.

Habits
The black-fronted duiker is territorial and monogamous, each pair owning a territory that it defends against neighbours and is marked using the secretions of the facial glands. The pair have habitual paths within their territory that connect sleeping sites with feeding areas and allow them to be active during both day and night. They are mainly browsers but will also feed on fruit.

Subspecies

The currently recognised subspecies are:

Cephalophus nigrifrons fosteri St. Leger, 1934
Cephalophus nigrifrons hooki St. Leger, 1934
Cephalophus nigrifrons hypoxanthus Grubb and Groves, 2002
Cephalophus nigrifrons kivuensis Lönnberg, 1919
Cephalophus nigrifrons nigrifrons Gray, 1871 .
Cephalophus nigrifrons rubidus Thomas, 1901: Ruwenzori duiker

References

External links

black-fronted duiker
Fauna of Central Africa
black-fronted duiker
black-fronted duiker
Taxobox binomials not recognized by IUCN